Marius Gersbeck (20 June 1995) is a German professional footballer who plays as a goalkeeper for Karlsruher SC.

Career
Gersbeck made his professional debut at 18 years old for Hertha BSC on 21 December 2013, in a Bundesliga match against Borussia Dortmund in Westfalenstadion as a starter, helping Hertha to a 1–2 away victory.

In June 2016, he joined VfL Osnabrück on loan for the 2016–17 season.

In June 2019 Gersbeck left Hertha BSC permanently after 15 years to join 2. Bundesliga club Karlsruher SC.

References

External links
 
 

1995 births
Living people
Footballers from Berlin
German footballers
Association football goalkeepers
Germany youth international footballers
Hertha BSC players
Hertha BSC II players
Chemnitzer FC players
VfL Osnabrück players
Karlsruher SC players
Bundesliga players
2. Bundesliga players
3. Liga players